Slashing in ice hockey is a penalty called when an offending player swings their hockey stick at an opposing player, regardless of contact, or breaks an opposing player's stick with their own. Such a penalty may range from a minor penalty to a match penalty, depending on the seriousness of the injury to the opposing player. It is also a penalty in the sport of ringette. This article deals chiefly with ice hockey.

Non-aggressive stick contact to the pant or front of the shin pads should not be penalized as slashing. Any forceful or powerful chop with the stick on an opponent’s body, the opponent’s stick, or on or near the opponent’s hands that, in the judgment of the referee, is not an attempt to play the puck, shall be penalized as slashing.

References

External links
 National Hockey League Rulebook Rule 61 - Slashing

Ice hockey penalties
Ice hockey terminology
Violence in ice hockey

fr:Cinglage (hockey sur glace)